Lester and Norma Dent House, also known as the House of Gadgets, is a historic home located at La Plata, Macon County, Missouri.  It was built in 1941, and is a one-and-a-half-story, Modern Movement style dwelling sheathed in brick and asbestos siding. The house has a gable roof and is of the Cape Cod cottage type.  It was the home of American pulp-fiction author Lester Dent (1904-1959).

It was listed on the National Register of Historic Places in 1990.

References

Houses on the National Register of Historic Places in Missouri
Modernist architecture in Missouri
Houses completed in 1941
Houses in Macon County, Missouri
National Register of Historic Places in Macon County, Missouri